Stare Zalesie may refer to the following places:
Stare Zalesie, Bielsk County in Podlaskie Voivodeship (north-east Poland)
Stare Zalesie, Gmina Czyżew-Osada in Podlaskie Voivodeship (north-east Poland)
Stare Zalesie, Gmina Klukowo in Podlaskie Voivodeship (north-east Poland)
Stare Zalesie, Zambrów County in Podlaskie Voivodeship (north-east Poland)